The Japanese sawshark (Pristiophorus japonicus) is a species of sawshark in the family Pristiophoridae. This shark has a long, narrow rostrum. Its first dorsal fin originates behind the tips of the pectoral fins, and its caudal fin is angled almost straight in line with the body.

Range and habitat
This species may vertically migrate in the water column because of changes in temperature.

Behavior
The Japanese sawshark has a varied diet of small benthic organisms. Like seemingly all sawsharks, this species is ovoviviparous. After an unknown gestation period, the female shark gives live birth to around 12 pups.

Conservation
With little information on population size or frequency of bycatch, the Japanese sawshark is listed by the IUCN Red List as being Least Concern.  Due to its benthic lifestyle, and because the range of this shark is heavily fished, it is safe to assume that the Japanese sawshark is at considerable risk of being caught as bycatch in bottom trawling and gillnet operations. Because of its habitat and behavior, this shark poses no threat to humans.

References

External links
 Species Description of Pristiophorus japonicus at www.shark-references.com

Japanese sawshark
East China Sea
Fish of Japan
Japanese sawshark
Japanese sawshark